Groswater Bay (Inuttitut: Kangerliorsoak), also known by other names, is a bay in south central Labrador, Canada.

Names
Groswater Bay's name is a compound formed from French  ("fat; thick; course, rough") and English water, reflecting the long history of using the area for fishing. It has also been known as Ivucktoke or Aviktok (Inuttitut: Aivitok); Eskimo or Esquimaux Bay ("Bay of the Eskimos"); and St Louis Bay. These names are also sometimes extended to Hamilton Inlet and even Lake Melville.

Fauna
Many birds nest here, including common eiders.

Legacy
The Groswater culture of Paleo-Eskimos is named after Groswater Bay.

References

Citations

Bibliography
 .

External links
 A map of Labrador with Hamilton Inlet shown excluding L. Melville
 "River Flow and Winter Hydrographic Structure of the Hamilton Inlet-Lake Melville Estuary of Labrador", which treats Hamilton Inlet as synonymous with Groswater Bay and exclusive of Lake Melville

Bays of Newfoundland and Labrador
Labrador